The Toronto International Film Festival Award for Best International Short Film is an annual film award, presented by the Toronto International Film Festival to a film judged to be the best short film by an international filmmaker at the festival. The award was presented for the first time in 2014.

Winners

References

International Short Film
Short film awards